John Patrick Hayden (25 April 1863 – 3 July 1954) was an Irish nationalist politician. As a member of the Irish Parliamentary Party, he served in the House of Commons of the United Kingdom of Great Britain and Ireland from 1897 to 1918 as Member of Parliament (MP) for South Roscommon.  He was also editor and proprietor of the Westmeath Examiner, published in Mullingar, Co. Westmeath, and a member of the Irish Board of Agriculture.   He was imprisoned four times by the British administration under different Coercion Acts.

He was the seventh son of Luke and Mary Hayden of County Roscommon, and was educated at St Comans, Roscommon.  In 1912 he married Henrietta Hill, daughter of Thomas Scott of Hannaville, Greenisland, Co. Antrim.

Hayden founded the Westmeath Examiner in 1882, when he was not yet 20.  In his early days he also made valuable contributions to Irish literature.  He was an active campaigner during the Land War and Plan of Campaign of the 1880s.  Like his older brother Luke Hayden, MP for South Leitrim and later for South Roscommon, John Hayden supported Charles Stewart Parnell during the split in the Irish nationalist movement from 1890 over Parnell's leadership.  As a result, the Westmeath Examiner was subjected to a clerically organized boycott, and only survived commercially through a pact between Unionists and Parnellites on the Mullingar Board of Guardians, dividing advertising between pro-Parnellite and Unionist papers and excluding the clericalist Westmeath Independent.

On Luke's unexpected death in 1897, John Hayden was adopted as the Parnellite candidate to succeed him at South Roscommon.  He was returned unopposed at the ensuing by-election and remained unopposed in the same seat at each succeeding general election until 1918, when he was defeated by the prominent Sinn Féiner Harry Boland by 10,685 votes to 4,233.  Fitzpatrick (2003, pp. 109–12) gives a vivid account of the turbulent election campaign at South Roscommon in 1918.

In spite of his role as a land campaigner, in the early 1900s Hayden was himself the target for hostile agitation headed by Laurence Ginnell, who saw him as symbolising the Irish Party's hypocritical tolerance of ‘grazing’, the operation of large tracts of land for cattle-rearing rather than as smaller holdings for poorer farmers.

Hayden was a close associate of the leader of the Irish Party, John Redmond.  He was consulted by Redmond before he made his historic statement in the British House of Commons in August 1914 committing Irish Volunteer support for Britain and her Allies and in the First World War.  He was also one of the committee of six who drafted the Irish Parliamentary Party manifesto for the 1918 general election.

After his Parliamentary defeat, Hayden continued to take an active part in the editorship of the Westmeath Examiner until a fortnight before his death.  By the time Hayden died at the age of 91 in July 1954, he was thought to be the last survivor of the Irish Parliamentary Party which had dominated Irish politics up to 1918 (but see entry on Patrick Whitty).

Sources
 Paul Bew, Conflict and Conciliation in Ireland 1890–1910:  Parnellites and Radical Agrarians, Oxford, Clarendon Press, 1987
 Dod's Parliamentary Companion, 1912
 David Fitzpatrick, Harry Boland's Irish Revolution, Cork University Press, 2003
 Stephen Gwynn, John Redmond’s Last Years, London, Edward Arnold, 1919
 Irish Times, 5 July 1954
 F. S. L. Lyons, John Dillon: A Biography, London, Routledge & Kegan Paul, 1968
 Patrick Maume, The Long Gestation: Irish Nationalist Life 1891–1918, Dublin, Gill & MacMillan
 Brian M. Walker (ed.), Parliamentary Election Results in Ireland, 1801–1922, Dublin, Royal Irish Academy, 1978
 Who Was Who 1951-1960

External links
 

1863 births
1954 deaths
19th-century Irish people
People from County Roscommon
Members of the Parliament of the United Kingdom for County Roscommon constituencies (1801–1922)
Irish Parliamentary Party MPs
Parnellite MPs
UK MPs 1895–1900
UK MPs 1900–1906
UK MPs 1906–1910
UK MPs 1910
UK MPs 1910–1918